Fappi Mokhk, Babiy, Vappi, Vabua (Vappua), exonym: Kistetia — historical region in Ingushetia. The center of Fyappiy Mokhk was village Metskhal. Fyappiy Mokhk is the territory of historical settlement of Ingush society Fyappiy.

Geography 
Suleymanov, brought the following boundaries of the historical region in the west with Dzhairakh, in the south with Khevsureti, in the east with Khamkh and Tsori, in the north it went out into a flat plain. The Fyappiy district occupied a significant territory of the Armkhi Gorge and was in contact with the plain in the north. The geography of the initial distribution of this ethnonym A. N. Genko relates “to the west of the Lomeka River (the ancient name of the Terek River)”, covering the entire territory of the modern Republic of Ossetia.

History 
The historical area Fyappiy Mokhk was mentioned as "Kistetia", as well as "Kistia" or "Kistinia". The Georgian prince, historian and geographer of the 18th century Vakhushti Bagrationi localizes Kistetia along the gorge of the Armkhi River (historical "Kistinka"), that is in mountainous Ingushetia.

According to the German researcher J. A. Güldenstädt, who visited the Caucasus in 1770-1773, the district of Fyappiy was subject to either Oksay or Kabardian princes, and in ancient times was subject to Georgia.

Settlements 
- Eban

- Goust

- Tathariye

- Hyarpie

- Tyaka khastie

- Khast-Moki

- Falkhan

- Khamishkie

- Ärzi

- Morch

- Tyarsh and others.

Notes

References

Bibliography 
 
 
 
 
 
 
 
 
 
 
 
 
 
 
 

Geography of Ingushetia